NGC 6072 is a planetary nebulae in the southern constellation of Scorpius. It has a dynamical age of 104 years. Its circumstellar envelope is likely to be rich in carbon as it has very strong CN (cyanide) spectral lines. CN spectral lines are generally not detected in oxygen rich AGB (asymptotic giant branch) circumstellar envelopes. NGC 6072 also shows H2 (hydrogen) emission and intense CO (carbon monoxide) emission which has been mapped displaying bipolarity and some gas at high velocity. The evolution of this planetary nebulae is likely to be dominated by photodissociation and ion/radical molecular reactions. Shock chemistry is also likely to be important. 

An analysis of Gaia data suggests that the central star is a binary system.

References

External links
 

Planetary nebulae
6072
Scorpius (constellation)